Jacob Walcher (May 7, 1887 – March 27, 1970) was a German communist politician and trade unionist.

Biography 

Walcher was born in 1887 in the rural Swabia to a family of poor religious Protestant farmers and learned the profession of metal working.
He became a member of the German Metal Workers' Union and of the Social Democratic Party of Germany (SPD).
After World War I, he joined the newly founded Communist Party of Germany.
Walcher split from this party and become a leading member of the illegal Socialist Workers' Party of Germany after 1933.
In the German Democratic Republic he was a member of the ruling Socialist Unity Party of Germany (SED) and was the victim of a purge in 1952.

References 

1887 births
1970 deaths
People from Biberach (district)
People from the Kingdom of Württemberg
Social Democratic Party of Germany politicians
Communist Party of Germany politicians
Communist Party of Germany (Opposition) politicians
Socialist Workers' Party of Germany politicians
Socialist Unity Party of Germany politicians
Recipients of the Patriotic Order of Merit in gold
German newspaper editors